Marmalade is a fruit preserve made from the juice and peel of citrus fruits boiled with sugar and water. The well-known version is made from bitter orange. It is also made from lemons, limes, grapefruits, mandarins, sweet oranges, bergamots, and other citrus fruits, or a combination. Citrus is the most typical choice of fruit for marmalade, though historically the term has often been used for non-citrus preserves.

The preferred citrus fruit for marmalade production is the Spanish Seville or bitter orange, Citrus aurantium var. aurantium, prized for its high pectin content, which sets readily to the thick consistency expected of marmalade. The peel imparts a bitter taste.

The word "marmalade" is borrowed from the Portuguese , from  'quince'.

Unlike jam, a large quantity of water is added to the fruit in a marmalade, the extra liquid being set by the high pectin content of the fruit. In this respect it is like a jelly, but whereas the fruit pulp and peel are strained out of jelly to give it its characteristic clarity, it is retained in a marmalade.

Origins 

The Romans learned from the Greeks that quinces slowly cooked with honey would "set" when cool.  The Apicius gives a recipe for preserving whole quinces, stems and leaves attached, in a bath of honey diluted with defrutum—Roman marmalade. Preserves of quince and lemon appear—along with rose, apple, plum and pear—in the Book of ceremonies of the Byzantine Emperor Constantine VII .

Medieval quince preserves, which went by the French name , produced in a clear version and a fruit pulp version, began to lose their medieval seasoning of spices in the 16th century. In the 17th century, La Varenne provided recipes for both thick and clear .

In 1524, Henry VIII received a "box of marmalade" from Mr Hull of Exeter. As it was in a box, this was probably , a solid quince paste from Portugal, still made and sold in southern Europe. "Marmalet" was served at the wedding banquet of the daughter of John Neville in Yorkshire in 1530. Its Portuguese origins can be detected in the remarks in letters to Lord Lisle, from William Grett, 12 May 1534, "I have sent to your lordship a box of marmaladoo, and another unto my good lady your wife" and from Richard Lee, 14 December 1536, "He most heartily thanketh her Ladyship for her marmalado". It was a favourite treat of Anne Boleyn and her ladies in waiting.

The English recipe book of Eliza Cholmondeley, dated from 1677 and held at the Chester Record Office in the Cheshire county archivists, has one of the earliest marmalade recipes ("Marmelet of Oranges") which produced a firm, thick dark paste. The Scots are credited with developing marmalade as a spread, with Scottish recipes in the 18th century using more water to produce a less solid preserve.

The first printed recipe for orange marmalade, though without the chunks typically used now, was in Mary Kettilby's 1714 cookery book, A Collection of above Three Hundred Receipts (pages 78–79). Kettilby called for whole oranges, lemon juice and sugar, with the acid in the lemon juice helping to create the pectin set of marmalade, by boiling the lemon and orange juice with the pulp. Kettilby then directs: "boil the whole pretty fast 'till it will jelly" – the first known use of the word "jelly" in marmalade making. Kettilby then instructs that the mixture is then poured into glasses, covered and left until set. As the acid would create a jelly, this meant that the mixture could be pulled from the heat before it had turned to a paste, keeping the marmalade much brighter and the appearance more translucent, as in modern-day marmalade.

The Scots moved marmalade to the breakfast table, and in the 19th century, the English followed the Scottish example and abandoned the eating of marmalade in the evening. Marmalade's place in British life appears in literature. James Boswell remarks that he and Samuel Johnson were offered it at breakfast in Scotland in 1773. When American writer Louisa May Alcott visited Britain in the 1800s, she described "a choice pot of marmalade and a slice of cold ham" as "essentials of English table comfort".

Etymology 

Marmalade first appeared in the English language in 1480, borrowed from French  which, in turn, came from the Galician-Portuguese word . According to José Pedro Machado's , the oldest known document where this Portuguese word is to be found is Gil Vicente's play Comédia de Rubena, written in 1521:

 
 

The extension of marmalade in the English language to refer to a preserve made from citrus fruits occurred in the 17th century, when citrus first began to be plentiful enough in England for the usage to become common.

Greek   'sweet apple', from  'honey' +   'apple, round fruit', became Galician-Portuguese  'quince'.

In Portuguese,  is a preserve made from quinces, quince cheese.

In reality, the word's origin has nothing to do with Mary.

International usage 

In much of Europe and Latin America, cognates for the English term marmalade are still used as a generic term for pulpy preserves of all fruits, whereas in Britain it refers solely to preserves typically of citrus peel, such as from grapefruit, orange or lemon. The name originated in the 16th century from Middle French  and Portuguese, where  applied to quince jam.

It is often sold in the form of marmalade slices made to resemble citrus wedges. An example of marmeladi candies in Finland is Vihreät kuulat (Finnish for "green balls"), a brand of pear-flavored gummy candies created by Finnish confectioner Karl Fazer from a recipe from St. Petersburg.

Legal definitions

Canadian regulations 

Under the Food and Drug Regulations (C.R.C., c. 870), marmalade is a standardized food and defined as a food of jelly-like composition that consists of at least 65% water-soluble solids. The regulations permit the use of pH adjusting agents to prevent the marmalade from dehydration, antifoaming agents to prevent blemishes on surface coatings and enable efficient filling of containers, and an acid ingredient to compensate for the natural acidity of the citrus fruit used. If pectin is added, the marmalade must contain at least 27% of peel, pulp, or juice of citrus fruit. Class II preservatives may also be used.

The Canadian Food and Drug Regulations (C.R.C., c. 870) specify that pineapple or fig marmalade must be of jelly-like consistency, achieved by boiling the pulp of juice of the fruit with water, and a sweetening ingredient. Pineapple or fig marmalade should contain at least 45% of the named fruit.

European regulation 
Since 1979, the EU directive 79/693/CEE defines marmalade as a jam made from citrus fruits. The directive was replaced on 20 December 2001 by the ruling 32001L0113. The translated versions of this document keep the English definition of "marmalade" as referring to citrus fruits, even if the other languages use the corresponding word normally in the broader sense of a "jam".

Dundee 

The Scottish city of Dundee has a long association with marmalade. James Keiller and his wife Janet ran a small sweet and preserves shop in the Seagate area of Dundee. In 1797, they opened a factory to produce "Dundee Marmalade", a preserve distinguished by thick chunks of bitter Seville orange rind.  The business prospered, and remains a signature marmalade producer today.

According to a Scottish legend, the creation of orange marmalade in Dundee occurred by accident. The legend tells of a ship carrying a cargo of oranges that broke down in the port, resulting in some ingenious locals making marmalade out of the cargo. However, this legend was "decisively disproved by food historians", according to a New York Times report.

In popular culture 

Children's literature
 Paddington Bear is known for his liking of marmalade, particularly in sandwiches, and kept it in his briefcase wherever he went. Paddington Bear is now used on the label of the smaller peel ("shred") and clearer/milder Robertson's "Golden Shred" marmalade, in place of the previous icon, "Golliwog", which is considered racially offensive. The 2014 movie Paddington led to a slight increase in marmalade sales in the UK.

Literature
 In Jane Austen's 1811 novel Sense and Sensibility an over-indulgent mother feeds apricot marmalade to her fussy three-year-old child who has been slightly scratched by a pin in the mother's hair.
 In Agatha Christie's 1953 detective novel A Pocket Full of Rye, the murder weapon is poisoned orange marmalade consumed at breakfast by the victim.

See also 

 Keiller's marmalade
 List of spreads
 Succade
  (yuzu marmalade)
 Zest (ingredient)

References 
Notes

Further reading

External links 
 

 
Citrus dishes
Orange production
Portuguese cuisine
Scottish cuisine